Taos Regional Airport  is a public use airport eight nautical miles (15 km) northwest of the central business district of Taos, in Taos County, New Mexico, United States. It is owned by the Town of Taos. FAA's National Plan of Integrated Airport Systems for 2009–2013 classifies it as a general aviation airport.

Although many U.S. airports use the same three-letter location identifier for the FAA and IATA, this airport is assigned SKX by the FAA and TSM by the IATA (which assigned SKX to Saransk Airport in Saransk, Russia).

Facilities
It opened in March, 1967 with one runway designated 4/22 with an asphalt surface 5,803 by 75 feet (1,769 x 23 m). On August 25, 2017, a second runway was opened. Designated 13/31, it also has asphalt surface, and is 8,600 by 100 feet (2,621 x 30 m). As of the fall of 2022, a new 8000 square foot terminal building is planned for construction in the near future.

For the 12-month period ending April 7, 2009, the airport had 13,250 aircraft operations, an average of 36 per day. These operations included 95% general aviation, 3% air taxi, and 2% military. At that time, there were 43 aircraft based at the airport: 88% single-engine, 5% multi-engine and 7% ultralight.

Airlines and destinations

Historical airline service
The Taos Regional Airport first opened in March, 1967 as the Taos Municipal Airport.
Taos has seen scheduled airline service by several commuter and regional air carriers. The first known carrier was Trans Central Airlines which provided service to Albuquerque during the winter of 1968/1969. The Santa Fe Airline Company provided service in 1973 and 1974 with flights to Santa Fe and Albuquerque. In 1974 and 1975, Mountain Air provided flights to Denver, Santa Fe, and Albuquerque. Zia Airlines from 1975 through 1978 operated flights to Santa Fe and Albuquerque. Mesa Airlines came to Taos from 1987 through 1991 with flights to Albuquerque and seasonal service to Denver using Beechcraft 99, Beechcraft 1300, and Cessna 208 Caravan aircraft. Rio Grande Air, based in Taos, operated flights to Santa Fe, Los Alamos, and Albuquerque from 1999 through 2004 also using Cessna Caravans. Other carriers which briefly operated flights to Albuquerque were: JetAire in 1985, Sierra West in 1987, and Westward in 2005. During the winter ski season of 2000/2001, Ozark Airlines (later changing to Great Plains Airlines) operated twice-weekly flights to Dallas/Ft. Worth using 32-seat Fairchild Dornier 328JETs. 

There was no commercial service from 2005 until the current provider, Taos Air, began winter ski-season service in late 2018 with flights to Austin and Dallas Love Field airport also using Fairchild Dornier 328Jets. During the 2019–2020 ski season, Taos Air expanded with flights to Los Angeles via the Hawthorne Municipal Airport and to San Diego via the McClellan–Palomar Airport. There was no service during the 2020–2021 season due to the COVID-19 pandemic in New Mexico, but service resumed later in 2021 with flights during the summer season. Winter and summer seasonal service has since resumed and the carrier is working to provide year-round service. In June 2022, service to Austin was moved to Austin Executive Airport. In December 2022, Taos Air switched operators to JSX and started using JSX's Embraer 135 and Embraer 145 aircraft. Alongside this change saw Austin service return to Austin-Bergstrom International Airport, Hawthorne was moved to Hollywood Burbank Airport, and McClellan-Palomar was moved to San Diego International Airport.

Accidents and incidents 
The accident was attributed to the pilot's decision to take off in icing conditions exceeding the aircraft's ability to continue flight. A contributing factor was inadequate pre-flight deicing.
 29 March 1992: A Rockwell 690A, registration number N111FL, crashed into rising terrain after taking off at night in low visibility. The pilot and four passengers were seriously injured and one passenger was killed. The accident was attributed to the pilot's failure to maintain the climb, compounded by poor visibility.
 24 February 2000: A Cessna 182E, registration number N2988Y, crashed during a visual flight rules approach at night. The pilot and sole occupant, who had reported difficulty seeing the runway due to snowfall, was killed. The accident was attributed to the pilot's decision to disregard weather information and fly under visual flight rules into instrument meteorological conditions (VFR into IMC).
 8 November 2002: An IAI 1124A Westwind, registration number N61RS, crashed during an Instrument Landing System (ILS) approach, killing both pilots. The accident was attributed to "The pilot's inadvertent flight into mountain wave weather conditions while IMC, resulting in a loss of aircraft control."
 10 July 2013: A Flight Design CTSW, registration number N424CT, flew into sudden extreme turbulence while maneuvering in the airfield traffic pattern; the aircraft dropped, rolled, and struck the ground in a nose-low attitude, killing one pilot and seriously injuring the other. Investigators determined that the aircraft had flown into a dust devil, resulting in a loss of control.
 18 June 2015: A Northwing Design Apache Sport ultralight trike, registration number N51311, suddenly "[fell] out of the sky" during a right turn soon after takeoff, striking the ground and killing the pilot. Investigators were unable to determine a reason for the pilot's apparent loss of aircraft control.

References

External links 
 Taos Regional Airport, official Town of Taos page
 Aerial photo as of 5 October 1997 from USGS The National Map
 

Airports in New Mexico
Transportation in Taos County, New Mexico
Buildings and structures in Taos County, New Mexico
Airport